Deborah "Debbie" Allan (born 21 July 1975) is a former British judoka. She won three European Championship medals, including a gold at the 1999 European Judo Championships. Allan was scheduled to compete at the 2000 Summer Olympics, but was disqualified at the weigh-in for being over the weight limit.

Career
Allan is from Camberley, Surrey, England, and trained at the Camberley Judo Club. In 1993, she became champion of Great Britain, winning the featherweight division at the British Judo Championships. The following year in 1994, she won a bronze medal at the 1994 European Judo Championships and retained her British title. Also in 1994, she was involved in a row with coach Mark Earle, which led to him being temporarily suspended by British Judo. 

In 1995, she won her third consecutive British featherweight title. Her next major success came when she won a silver medal at the 1998 European Judo Championships before winning the gold medal at the 1999 European Judo Championships, in the gold medal match she defeated Paula Saldanha. 

Her coach Diane Bell cut Allan's hair and made her stand naked on the weighing scales. She was banned by the British Judo selection panel for six months, although this was later overturned on appeal.

References

External links
 

1975 births
British female judoka
Olympic judoka of Great Britain
Judoka at the 2000 Summer Olympics
Living people
People from Camberley
20th-century British women